Thomas Michael Cox (19 January 1930 – 2 August 2018) was a British Labour Party politician who was the Member of Parliament (MP) for Wandsworth Central from 1970 to 1974 and then for Tooting from 1974 to 2005.

Early life
Cox was educated at a state school and the London School of Economics after which, according to his entry in Who's Who, he became an "electrical worker".

Political career
He served as an alderman of Fulham Borough Council from 1960 to 1965, and as a Councillor for Halford Ward on the London Borough of Hammersmith and Fulham from 1964 to 1967, as well as serving on the Inner London Education Authority.

Before being elected for Wandsworth Central in 1970, he had stood unsuccessfully for Stroud in 1966. He served as a whip in the Wilson and Callaghan Governments. He lived in Southfields in the London Borough of Wandsworth.

References

 
Obituary: Tom Cox – Former MP, Friend of Cyprus

1930 births
2018 deaths
Alumni of the London School of Economics
Councillors in the London Borough of Hammersmith and Fulham
Electrical, Electronic, Telecommunications and Plumbing Union-sponsored MPs
Labour Party (UK) MPs for English constituencies
UK MPs 1970–1974
UK MPs 1974
UK MPs 1974–1979
UK MPs 1979–1983
UK MPs 1983–1987
UK MPs 1987–1992
UK MPs 1992–1997
UK MPs 1997–2001
UK MPs 2001–2005
Members of Fulham Metropolitan Borough Council